Herbert Jones (3 September 1896 – 11 September 1973) was an English professional footballer. He played for Blackpool, six times in the England team, and was a member of the FA Cup winning team Blackburn Rovers in 1928. He played as a defender.

Early life
Jones trained as a plumber before World War I. During the war, he was stationed in France. He took part in the truce of Christmas 1915. He became a pacifist and remained so for the rest of his life.

In the summer of 1915 or 1916 he was hit by shrapnel when a shell exploded nearby. As a result of this injury he was honourably discharged.

Football career

Jones began his football career, whilst still a part-time plumber, with his hometown club, Blackpool, making his debut on 16 December 1922, in a goalless draw against Hull City at Bloomfield Road. He went on to make a further fifteen league appearances during the 1922–23 campaign, in what was Bill Norman's final season in charge of the Seasiders.

Under new manager Major Frank Buckley in 1923–24, Jones made 28 league appearances. He also featured in Blackpool's two FA Cup ties that season.

The following season, 1924–25, Jones appeared in 34 of the club's 42 league dates. He again appeared during the club's FA Cup run, this time helping them to the fourth round. They were knocked out by Blackburn Rovers at Ewood Park by a single goal in front of a crowd of 60,000.

Blackburn approached Blackpool the following season, 1925–26, with a view to signing the defender. Blackpool accepted the £6,000 offer, and in mid-January he moved east across Lancashire. His final appearance for Blackpool occurred on 12 December 1925, in a goalless draw at Wolverhampton Wanderers.

Jones went on to play 247 league games for Rovers spanning from 1925 to 1934. He won the FA Cup with the club in 1928 (see 1928 FA Cup Final). After their relegation to Division Two in 1935–36, Rovers returned to the top flight in 1938–39.

Jones then joined Brighton & Hove Albion for a season, making 37 league appearances.

He finished his career back on the Fylde with Fleetwood Town.

International career
While at Blackburn, Jones received six caps for England. He made his debut for his country against Scotland on 2 April 1927. 
His final cap was also gained against the Scots, on 31 March 1928.

Family
Jones was married to Florence and had one daughter, Ivy (born May 1926).

Death
Jones died on 11 September 1973, at the age of 77.

References
Specific

General

External links
Herbert Jones's profile at The FA.com
A picture of Jones (sixth from right) in line with his Blackburn Rovers teammates at the 1928 FA Cup Final, meeting King George V
England Football Online retrieved 9 April 2013

1896 births
Sportspeople from Blackpool
British Army personnel of World War I
English footballers
England international footballers
Blackpool F.C. players
Blackburn Rovers F.C. players
Brighton & Hove Albion F.C. players
Fleetwood Town F.C. players
1973 deaths
English Football League players
English Football League representative players
Association football fullbacks
FA Cup Final players